Miu Tsai Tun (Chinese: 廟仔墩) is a mountain that lies within Clear Water Bay Country Park, Hong Kong. Its name in Chinese means "Small Temple Mound" because there is a small temple on the northeast side of the mountain.

Geography 
Miu Tsai Tun is 333m in height. To the south lies a famous mountain called High Junk Peak.

Access 
High Junk Peak Country Trail runs through the foot of Miu Tsai Tun, west of the Summit. It is possible to access the summit of Miu Tsai Tun from entrances on the High Junk Peak Country Trail.  The path to the summit is rather rugged and not maintained by the government, so proper footwear is advisable.

See also 

 List of mountains, peaks and hills in Hong Kong
 High Junk Peak
 Clear Water Bay Country Park

References

External links 

 High Junk Peak Country Trail

Mountains, peaks and hills of Hong Kong